Clues'o' is a 1985 video game published by Imperial Software.

Gameplay
Clues'o''' is a game in which the player is a French detective who must solve the murder of Major Fawcett.

Reception
D J Robinson reviewed Clues'o' for Imagine magazine, and stated that "In conclusion, Clues O is a pleasant little game of slightly below average difficulty. The graphics are well drawn, and the text, though sparse, is adequate."

References

External links
Review in Computer & Video GamesReview in ZX Computing''

1985 video games